Brodzikowo  is a settlement in the administrative district of Gmina Mrągowo, within Mrągowo County, Warmian-Masurian Voivodeship, in northern Poland.

The settlement has a population of 50.

References

Brodzikowo